Alexei Murygin (born November 16, 1986) is a Russian professional ice hockey goaltender who is currently playing under contract with Kunlun Red Star in the Kontinental Hockey League (KHL).

Playing career
Murygin originally played for Amur Khabarovsk, making his professional debut in the 2006–07 season of the then Russian Superleague (RSL) before featuring making his first appearance in the KHL during the 20095–10 season.

Approaching his 12th season in the KHL, Murygin joined Torpedo Nizhny Novgorod, agreeing to a one-year contract to be the club's backup goaltender on 12 August 2021.

On 6 June 2022, Murygin joined his sixth KHL club, HC Neftekhimik Nizhnekamsk, signing a one-year deal as a free agent.

References

External links

1986 births
Living people
Amur Khabarovsk players
Avangard Omsk players
HC Kunlun Red Star players
Lokomotiv Yaroslavl players
Metallurg Magnitogorsk players
HC Neftekhimik Nizhnekamsk players
Russian ice hockey goaltenders
Torpedo Nizhny Novgorod players